The Cathedral of the Holy Nativity is the home of the Anglican Diocese of Natal in Pietermaritzburg, South Africa in the kwaZulu-Natal Province. It is the episcopal seat of the Bishop of Natal. The cathedral is located in Langalibalele Street.

The building of the cathedral followed the uniting of two city parishes while Philip Russell was bishop, that is between 1974 and 1981. After being translated to Cape Town as archbishop, Russell returned to dedicate the cathedral on 22 November 1981.

The building is modern in design and is not universally loved.

References

External links
 

Churches in Pietermaritzburg
Churches completed in 1981
Religious organizations established in 1853
Pietermaritzburg
20th-century religious buildings and structures in South Africa